Ilijan Combined-Cycle Power Plant is a dual-fuel power station in Ilijan, Batangas City. It is primarily a natural gas plant and uses distillate oil as a secondary back-up fuel source. With the nameplate capacity of 1200 MW, it is the largest natural gas facility in the Philippines. The plant is designed to draw natural gas from the Malampaya gas field.

The plant is the first power facility in the country to use the 500 kV switchyard system and reverse osmosis system. The Ilijan plant's construction began in March 1999 and was commissioned in June 2000.

References

Natural gas-fired power stations in the Philippines
Buildings and structures in Batangas City
Energy infrastructure completed in 2000
Integrated water and power plants
20th-century architecture in the Philippines